Harry Weston (1928 – 13 July 2008) was a British basketball player. He competed in the men's tournament at the 1948 Summer Olympics. His brother, Stanley, also competed in the same tournament.

References

1928 births
2008 deaths
British men's basketball players
Olympic basketball players of Great Britain
Basketball players at the 1948 Summer Olympics
Sportspeople from Birmingham, West Midlands